(Out of deep anguish I call to You), 38, is a church cantata by Johann Sebastian Bach. He composed the chorale cantata in Leipzig in 1724 for the 21st Sunday after Trinity and first performed it on 29 October 1724.

The cantata is part of Bach's second cantata cycle, which focused on Lutheran hymns. The chorale cantata is based on Martin Luther's penitential hymn "", a paraphrase of Psalm 130. Luther's first and last stanza are used unchanged: the former treated as a chorale fantasia, the latter as a four-part closing chorale. An unknown librettist paraphrased the three inner stanzas as two sets of recitatives and arias. Bach scored the cantata for four vocal soloists, a four-part choir, and a Baroque instrumental ensemble of four trombones, two oboes, strings and continuo. The cantata is unusual in its use of the chorale tune not only in the outer movements, but as material for motifs in recitative and aria, once even taking the chorale melody as a continuo line. In keeping with the spirit of the 200-year-old hymn, which paraphrases the Old Testament, Bach used motet style in the outer movements, with all instruments, especially the four trombones, enforcing the vocal lines.

History and text 
Bach composed this chorale cantata in Leipzig in 1724. Written for the 21st Sunday after Trinity, it was part of his second annual cycle of cantatas which was planned as a cycle of chorale cantatas, based on prominent Lutheran hymns, for all occasions of the liturgical year.

The prescribed readings for the Sunday were from Paul's Epistle to the Ephesians, "take unto you the whole armour of God", and from the Gospel of John, the healing of the nobleman's son.

The cantata is based on Martin Luther's hymn "", a paraphrase of Psalm 130. It was in Bach's time the "required hymn" for the Sunday. Luther wrote about the psalm that it was coming from a 

The text of the chorale is unchanged for the first and last movements. An unknown poet paraphrased the other three stanzas of the chorale for movements 2 to 5. In a recitative which Bach set for soprano, the librettist added to Luther's text what Hofmann calls "essentially a free extension of its ideological content".

Bach led the first performance of the cantata on 29 October 1724.

Music

Structure and scoring 
Bach structured the cantata in six movements. The text and tune of the hymn are retained in the outer choral movements, a chorale fantasia and a four-part closing chorale, which frame two sets of recitative and aria. Bach scored the work for four vocal soloists (soprano, alto, tenor, bass), a four-part choir, and a Baroque instrumental ensemble of four trombones (Tb), two oboes (Ob), two violins (Vl), viola (Va) and basso continuo. This is one of three Bach cantatas to use four different trombone parts (soprano, alto, tenor, and bass), the others being Ach Gott, vom Himmel sieh darein, BWV 2 and Ich hatte viel Bekümmernis, BWV 21. The instruments play colla parte with the voices in the outer movements in the style of Bach's motets.

In the following table of the movements, the scoring follows the Neue Bach-Ausgabe. The keys and time signatures are taken from Alfred Dürr, using the  symbol for common time (4/4). The continuo, playing throughout, is not shown.

Movements 

In this cantata, Bach used the chorale melody not only in the opening chorale fantasia and the closing chorale, but also in the inner movements. He built an aria theme from parts of the melody, as in movement 3, used the melody as a continuo line (movement 4), and took motifs from the melody. The American musicologist Eric Chafe suggests that the entire cantata is also based on a "design" that descends tonally for the first five movements and rises again in the closing chorale, exploiting the textual theme of "destruction followed by restoration".

1 
The opening movement is a chorale fantasia, "" (Out of deep anguish I call to You), on the hymn tune in Phrygian mode. It combines the structure of a motet with chromatic and dissonant harmonies. As in his motets and the chorale cantata Ach Gott, vom Himmel sieh darein, BWV 2, Bach uses the old style of scoring, with all instruments doubling the vocal parts. The Bach scholar Klaus Hofmann notes that Bach's use of older musical style may reflect Bach pointing back at the source, Luther's paraphrase of a text from the Old Testament. The lower voices begin each line with imitation on the melody to come, which is then presented in long notes by the soprano as a cantus firmus. The musicologist Julian Mincham interprets the imitative counterpoint as a "portrayal of the individual cries of distress which coalesce to form a combined human clamour". John Eliot Gardiner, who conducted the Bach Cantata Pilgrimage in 2000, compares the style to both Heinrich Schütz and Anton Bruckner, observing that although using the means of older masters, Bach "push[es] the frontiers of this motet movement almost out of stylistic reach through abrupt chromatic twists to this tune in Phrygian mode."

2 
Like the fantasia, the alto recitative "" (In Jesus' grace alone), is stylistically archaic. The Bach scholar Alfred Dürr describes the secco recitative as "plain but forcefully declaimed". Mincham notes that its "semi-chaotic" form may reflect the tumult of evil and sin: the movement maintains a "archaic modal feel" but with a continuo line that "seems to lack the coherence one normally expects from a Bach bass".

3 
The tenor aria, "" (I hear, in the midst of my sorrows), is expressive with a prominent syncopated rhythmic motif which runs throughout the movement. The tenor line is part of a four-part texture with the oboes and continuo. The oboes play "continuously interwoven chromatic lines".

Luther intended the contrasting ideas of the psalm to represent "contradictory and disharmonious things, for hope and despair are opposites", and wrote in his song that we must "hope in despair", because "hope which forms the new man, grows in the midst of fear that cuts down the old Adam".

4 
A soprano recitative, "" (Alas! that my faith is yet so weak), adopts a modified version of the chorale melody as the continuo line. Gardiner notes the "uncompromising" way of changing the normal order: the soprano, usually singing a chorale cantus firmus (firm song) to the continuo, expresses weakness and insecurity here, marked "a battuta", while the firm foundation is the chorale in the bass, to which the text of stanza three, "" (Therefore I will hope in God), could be imagined. Gardiner points out a detail: the word "Zeichen" (sign) "is given expressive, symbolic expression, a diminished seventh chord assigned to that word … formed by all three 'signs", one sharp (F-sharp), one flat (E-flat) and one natural (C). As Eric Chafe concludes,

5 
The trio aria, "" (When my troubles like chains), compares to a trio as  part of cantata Du Friedefürst, Herr Jesu Christ, BWV 116, composed three weeks earlier, then expressing "" (Alas, we confess our sins). This is one of only three trios in this cantata cycle.

In this movement, "despair, like chains, fetters one misfortune to the next" is contrasted to "shall my Saviour free me suddenly from it all", presented as akin to morning following night. Bach expresses despair by a descending sequential ritornello based on the circle of fifths through the minor keys (D, G, C, F), finally reaching B-flat major), whereas the "dawning of faith" is illustrated with an upward motion. Mincham characterizes the ritornello as "comfortably conventional", in contrast with the "convoluted" theme. Hofmann notes the "operatic quality" of the movement, when for example on the words "" (so that everything suddenly releases me), the polyphony suddenly resolves to homophony.

6 
The four-part setting of the closing chorale, "" (Although the sins among us are many), begins with a dissonant chord, interpreted by Hofmann as a last cry of anguish "in an almost 'Romantic' manner". Gardiner comments: "With all the voices given full orchestral doubling (again, those four trombones!), this chorale is impressive, terrifying in its Lutheran zeal". Mincham notes the setting's "enigmatic" final cadence which "leaves us with a sense that the human condition is ongoing".

Recordings 
 Münchener Bach-Chor, Münchener Bach-Orchester, conducted by Karl Richter (1978). Bach Cantatas Vol. 5 – Sundays after Trinity II. Archiv Produktion.
 Gächinger Kantorei, Bach-Collegium Stuttgart, conducted by Helmuth Rilling (1980). Die Bach Kantate Vol. 56. Hänssler.
 Amsterdam Baroque Orchestra & Choir, conducted by Ton Koopman (2000). J. S. Bach: Complete Cantatas Vol. 13. Antoine Marchand.
 Holland Boys Choir, Netherlands Bach Collegium, conducted by Pieter Jan Leusink (2000). Bach Edition Vol. 18 – Cantatas Vol. 9. Brilliant Classics.
 Monteverdi Choir, English Baroque Soloists, conducted by John Eliot Gardiner (2000). Bach Cantatas Vol. 11. Soli Deo Gloria.
 Bach Collegium Japan & Concerto Palatino Brass Ensemble, conducted by Masaaki Suzuki (2004). J. S. Bach: Cantatas Vol. 29 – Cantatas from Leipzig 1724. BIS.

References

External links 
 
 Aus tiefer Not schrei ich zu dir BWV 38; BC A 152 / Chorale cantata (21st Sunday after Trinity) (Bach Digital)
 Luke Dahn: BWV 38.6 bach-chorales.com

Church cantatas by Johann Sebastian Bach
Psalm-related compositions by Johann Sebastian Bach
1724 compositions
Chorale cantatas